Jay Mitchell may refer to:
 Jay Mitchell, pseudonym used by American author Jennifer Roberson
 Jay Mitchell (judge), American lawyer and judge from Alabama
 Jay Mitchell (EastEnders)